Maimonides Medical Center is a non-profit, non-sectarian hospital located in Borough Park, in the New York City borough of Brooklyn, in the U.S. state of New York. Maimonides is both a treatment facility and academic medical center with 711 beds, and more than 70 primary care and sub-specialty programs. As of August 1, 2016, Maimonides Medical Center was an adult and pediatric trauma center, and Brooklyn's only pediatric trauma center.

History

Early years
The institution was founded in 1911 as the New Utrecht Dispensary. Several small dispensaries merged with Utrecht in 1919 to form the Israel Hospital of Brooklyn. In 1920 Israel Hospital merged with Zion Hospital to form United Israel Zion Hospital, later renamed Israel Zion Hospital. 
Maimonides Medical Center was formed as a result of the merger of United Israel Zion Hospital and Beth Moses Hospital in 1947. The institution was named after Rabbi Moshe Ben Maimon, a 12th-century Jewish philosopher and doctor.

Deadly fire
In 1993, a faulty respirator supplying oxygen to an elderly woman exploded, killing her and two other patients. Investigators said that an electrical fault in the machine had caused it to ignite. The fire created a blast fed by pure oxygen, which sent a fireball through a seventh-floor window. Fire officials said that two patients were burned to death, and a third patient across the hall, died of smoke inhalation. The faulty respirator was manufactured by Puritan Bennett. Barry M. Spero, the hospital's president at the time, said that biomedical engineers routinely checked the equipment according to specifications by the manufacturer. He referred to the incident as, "truly a catastrophic disaster."

The Hull & Associates report determined the equipment was not at fault. The explosive fire was the result of oxygen enrichment and a spark from a faulty outlet.

Expansion
The Maimonides Medical Center expanded its emergency department in 1997 with the opening of the Harry and Jeanette Weinberg Emergency Center. In September 2007, construction started on space in a new building at the corner of 48th Street and Fort Hamilton Parkway. There are two wings, the main differences being in the severity of patients seen. In 2015 Maimonides broke ground on 3.4 million square feet of medical office space to allow patients to visit an array of health care providers in the same building.

Affiliation
In February 2013, Maimonides Medical Center, the Albert Einstein College of Medicine of Yeshiva University, and Montefiore Medical Center signed an affiliation agreement that made Maimonides a university hospital and the Brooklyn campus of Albert Einstein College of Medicine.

In July 2021, Maimonides Medical Center announced an affiliation with New York Community Hospital, fully expanding a partnership that began with a clinical services agreement in 2018. Maimonides Medical Center will co-operate the smaller, 134-bed hospital.

Innovations
Several innovations in clinical medicine have occurred at Maimonides. In 1961, the commercial pacemaker was developed in the Maimonides Research Laboratory. The same laboratory was co-developer of the intra-aortic balloon pump in 1970. Implantation of first partial mechanical heart was performed in the hospital in 1966. The following year, the second human heart transplant in the world (and the first in the US) was performed at Maimonides by Dr. Adrian Kantrowitz. Several other technical feats were achieved by the clinicians in the hospital, such as the first needle aspiration biopsy in the US in 1981, the first robotic surgery for pediatric patients in the US in 2001, and the first angioplasty during a heart attack in 1983.

In 2007, the New York Times reported that in an analysis of about 5,000 hospitals by the Department of Health and Human services, Maimonides was one of the 50 hospitals with the lowest mortality rates. In 2010, Maimonides received the HealthGrades Distinguished Hospital Award for Clinical Excellence, ranking it among the top 5% of hospitals in the entire nation for overall quality outcomes. Maimonides was also listed among the top 5 individual hospitals in New York State for cardiology services, coronary interventional procedures, stroke treatment, and gastrointestinal medical services.

Maimonides Park
In May 2021, the Brooklyn Cyclones minor league baseball team announced their ballpark would be named Maimonides Park in a naming-rights deal with Maimonides Medical Center.

Information technology
Maimonides Medical Center is a pioneer in implementing health information technology. and is consistently ranked one of the "Most Wired" Hospitals.

Six Centers of Excellence
 The Cancer Center.
 The Brooklyn Breast Cancer Program at the Maimonides Medical Center is Brooklyn's first dedicated, multi specialty group breast cancer program.  The program is headquartered in the Gilbert Rivera Pavilion and is a beautiful, spa-like facility that features live plants, water features and the highest technology available including tomosynthesis mammography, 3T MRI and high resolution ultrasound. The program is accredited by the National Accreditation Program for Breast Centers (American College of Surgeons), the Commission on Cancer and is a three time Breast Imaging Center of Excellence (American College of Radiology). The program has treated more than 4000 women with primary breast cancer since 2008 and is recognized as one of America's top programs.  The program is Directed by Dr. Patrick Ivan Borgen who, prior to joining Maimonides, was the Chief Breast Cancer Surgeon at Memorial Sloan-Kettering Cancer Center in Manhattan for 15 years. 
 Maimonides Infants & Children's Hospital of Brooklyn. The Stella and Joseph Payson Birthing Center handles more births than any other hospital in New York State.
 The ACE "Acute Care for the Elderly" Unit focuses on elderly patients, their families and their home environments.
 The Jaffe Stroke Center. Maimonides has received the HealthGrades Stroke Care Excellence Award for 2008, 2009 and 2010.
 The Cardiac Institute offers invasive and noninvasive, medical and surgical, adult and pediatric care. The Cardiac Institute is a partnership between referring doctors, cardiologists, cardiothoracic surgeons, nurses and professional staff. Maimonides has received the HealthGrades Cardiac Care Excellence Award (2009, 2010) and the HealthGrades Coronary Intervention Excellence Award (2008, 2009 and 2010).

Diversity
Due to its culturally diversified location, Maimonides has recruited multilingual physicians, nurses, and staff. There are translators for 67 languages available through a commercially available service.

New York State Department of Health designations
Regional Perinatal Center
Stroke Center
Pediatric and Adult Trauma Center

Notable deaths
Norbert Pearlroth (1893-1983)

References

External links
Brooklyn Hospital

Hospitals in Brooklyn
Teaching hospitals in New York City
Medical Center
Hospitals established in 1911
Borough Park, Brooklyn